NKSP may refer to:

 Nankang Software Park in Taipei, Taiwan
 North Kern State Prison in California, United States